Located in Hillsboro, Ohio, Hillsboro Cemetery is home to multiple notable interments, including baseball player Kirby White (1844–1943) and politicians Joseph J. McDowell (1800–1877), Jacob J. Pugsley (1838–1920), John Armstrong Smith (1814–1892), Allen Trimble (1783–1870) and Wilbur M. White (1890–1973). Once known as the Greenwood Cemetery, it was created on May 30, 1862, when the Hillsborough (old spelling) Cemetery Association of the Town of Hillsborough purchased 31 acres, 1 quarter and 25 poles (12.7 hectare) of land from Allen and Rachel Trimble. This was the fifth cemetery created within the Town of Hillsborough. On July 22, 1862, the association sold to the Lafayette Lodge No. 25 of the Independent Order of Odd Fellows of Hillsborough 4 acres, 1 quarter and 15 poles (1.75 hectare). On August 21, 1883, the Lafayette Lodge conveyed back to the Association the land and one additional acre which Charles Wilson had deeded to the lodge for a roadway on December 13, 1878.

Gallery

References

External links
 
 

Cemeteries in Highland County, Ohio
Protected areas of Highland County, Ohio
1862 establishments in Ohio
Cemetery
Odd Fellows cemeteries in the United States
African-American cemeteries